Edward "Ned" Low (also spelled Lowe or Loe; 16901724) was a notorious pirate of English origin during the latter days of the Golden Age of Piracy, in the early 18th century. Low was born into poverty in Westminster, London, and was a thief from an early age. He moved to Boston, Massachusetts, as a young man. His wife died in childbirth in late 1719. Two years later, he became a pirate, operating off the coasts of New England and the Azores, and in the Caribbean.

Low captained a number of ships, usually maintaining a small fleet of three or four. Low and his pirate crews captured at least a hundred ships during his short career, burning most of them. Although he was active for only three years, Low remains notorious as one of the most vicious pirates of the age with a reputation for violently torturing his victims before murdering them.

Sir Arthur Conan Doyle described Low as "savage and desperate," and a man of "amazing and grotesque brutality." The New York Times called him a torturer, whose methods would have "done credit to the ingenuity of the Spanish Inquisition in its darkest days." The circumstances of Low's death, which took place around 1724, have been the subject of much speculation.

Early life
According to Charles Johnson's A General History of the Pyrates, Edward Low was born in Westminster, London, England, in 1690.
He was described as illiterate, having a "quarrelsome nature", and always ready to cheat,
running "wild in the streets of his native parish".
As a young man, he was said to be a pickpocket and gambler, playing games of chance with the footmen of the nearby House of Commons.

Most of his family appear to have been thieves. While young, his brother, Richard, was small for his age and is said to have been carried around in a basket on a friend's back; in a crowd, Richard would snatch the hats and wigs of passers-by. Richard later took to other forms of criminal activity and ended up hanged at Tyburn in 1707 for the burglary of a house in Stepney.

Life in Boston
As he advanced in age, Low tired of pickpocketing and thievery and turned to burglary. Eventually, he left England, and traveled alone to the New World around 1710. He spent three to four years in various locations, before settling in Boston, Massachusetts. On 12 August 1714, he married Eliza Marble at the First Church of Boston. They had a son, who died when he was an infant, and then a daughter named Elizabeth, born in the winter of 1719.

Eliza died in childbirth, leaving Low with his daughter. The loss of his wife had a profound effect on Low: in his later career of piracy, he would often express regret for the daughter he left behind, and refused to press-gang married men into joining his crews. He would also allow women to return to port safely. At first working honestly as a rigger, in early 1722 he joined a gang of twelve men on a sloop headed for Honduras, where they planned to collect a shipment of logs for resale in Boston.

Low was employed as a patron, supervising the loading and carrying of the logs. One day, he returned to the ship when hungry, but was told by the captain he would have to wait to eat, and that he and his men would have to be satisfied with a ration of rum. At this, Low "took up a loaded musket and fired at the captain but missed him, [and] shot another poor fellow through the throat".

Following this failed mutiny, Low and his friends were forced to leave the boat. A day later, Low led the twelve-man gang—which included Francis Farrington Spriggs, who went on to become a notorious pirate in his own right—in taking over a small sloop off the coast of Rhode Island. Killing one man during the theft, Low and his crew turned pirate, determined "to go in her, make a black Flag, and declare War against all the World."

Piracy

First mate
Low, using his newly captured ship, lay in wait on the popular shipping route between Boston and New York. Within a few days, he and his crew seized a sloop out of Rhode Island and plundered it. His crew cut the rigging away to prevent the sloop returning too quickly to port to raise the alarm. He then captured a number of unarmed merchantmen near Port Rosemary.

Low headed south and began operating in the waters of Grand Cayman, with a period as lieutenant to the established pirate George Lowther, who captained the Happy Delivery, a 100-ton Rhode Island sloop with eight cannon and ten swivel guns. When she was "destroyed by Indians", Lowther and his crew transferred to a sloop named the Ranger. Lowther's crew was constantly expanded by desperate sailors willing to join him. Fast acquiring a taste for cruelty, Low taught Spriggs a torture technique which involved tying a victim's hands with rope between their fingers and setting it alight, burning their flesh down to the bones.

Following a number of successful raids, Lowther eventually captured a large 6-gun brigantine (named Rebecca) on 28 May 1722. He gave it to Low to captain. With a crew of 44, Low amicably dissolved his partnership with Lowther.

Pirate captain
In one notable raid in June 1722, Low and his crew attacked thirteen New England fishing vessels sheltering at anchor in Port Roseway, Shelburne, Nova Scotia. Although outnumbered, Low hoisted his Jolly Roger flag and declared that no mercy would be given to the fishermen if any resisted. The fleet submitted and Low's men robbed every vessel. Low chose the largest, an 80-ton schooner which he renamed The Fancy and armed with 10 guns, to become his flagship. He sank the other ships of the fleet and abandoned the Rebecca.

The Boston News-Letter of 9 July 1722 published a list of those captured by Low. A number of the fishermen were forced to join Low, including Philip Ashton, who escaped in May 1723 on Roatán Island in the Bay Islands of Honduras, and who wrote a detailed account of life aboard Low's pirate ship. Before Ashton's escape, he had been beaten, whipped, kept in chains, and threatened with death many times - particularly by Low's quartermaster John Russell - as he refused to sign Low's articles and become a pirate.

Low's tactics consisted primarily of hoisting false colours and approaching an unsuspecting vessel. Off the coast of St John's, Newfoundland, Low mistook a fully armed man-of-war for a fishing boat, and barely escaped. He moved on to Conception Bay, capturing a number of boats around the Grand Banks southeast of Newfoundland before crossing the Atlantic to the Azores. There, he captured a French (or Portuguese—sources differ) pink, a narrow-sterned former man of war, which Low rearmed and refitted as his new flagship, naming it the Rose Pink. He also captured an English vessel with two Portuguese passengers aboard. Low had his crew hoist them up and drop them back down from the yard arm several times, until they died. He moved on to the Canaries, Cape Verde and then back across to the coast of Brazil, where he was driven back by foul weather.

Low abandoned his plans for plundering the rich shipping trade off the coast of Brazil, and moved on to the Caribbean. George Roberts, a mate on the British ship King Sagamore, recounted a meeting with Low aboard the Rose Pink. Roberts' ship was captured by Low's fleet, of which he was now styling himself "Commodore".

Capsizing of the Rose Pink
Forty leagues (120 nautical miles or around 220 km) to the east of Surinam, Low and his fleet of two ships (the Rose Pink and the Fancy, captained by a young Charles Harris) dropped anchor to remove growth such as seaweed and barnacles from the outside of the boats, in a process known as careening, necessary because no dry dock was available to pirates.

Still relatively inexperienced, Low ordered too many men to the outside of the boat to work on the buildup, and the Rose Pink tipped over too far. The portholes had been left open, and the vessel took on water and sank, taking two men with her. The Rose Pink had been carrying most of the provisions, and Low—by now captaining a captured schooner, the Squirrel—and his crew were forced to strictly ration their fresh water to half a pint (around 275 ml) per man, per day.

Failing to reach their initial destination of Tobago due to light winds and strong currents, Low's depleted fleet made it to Grenada, a French-owned island. Hiding most of his men belowdecks, he was permitted to send men ashore for water. The following day, a French sloop was sent out to investigate, but was captured when Low's men came out from hiding. Low, now commanding the captured sloop (renamed the Ranger), gave the schooner Squirrel to Spriggs, now his quartermaster, who renamed it the Delight before sailing away in the middle of the night with a small crew following a disagreement with Low over the disciplining of one of Spriggs' crew.

Early 1723

Low's new fleet captured many more sloops, including one Low kept, naming it the Fortune. During a trial on 10 July 1723 for a number of Low's crew, a sailor on board the Fortune named John Welland recalled how Low stripped his boat, including gold to the value of £150, then beat him and cut off his ear with a cutlass.

Following this, Low's fleet captured a Portuguese ship called the Nostra Signiora de Victoria on 25 January 1723. The Victoria's captain allowed a bag containing approximately 11,000 gold moidores (worth at the time around £15,000) to fall into the sea rather than see it captured. One of Low's most noted episodes of cruelty followed: in his rage, he slashed off the Portuguese captain's lips with a cutlass, broiled them, and forced the victim to eat them while still hot. He then murdered the remaining crew. Low's own men described him as "a maniac and a brute."

One story describes Low burning a French cook alive, saying he was a "greasy fellow who would fry well" and another tells he once killed 53 Spanish captives with his cutlass. Some historians, including David Cordingly, believe this was deliberately done to cultivate a ferocious image. Historian Edward Leslie described Low as a psychopath with a history filled with "mutilations, disembowelings, decapitations, and slaughter".

Low, like other pirates of the time, tried to intimidate his victims into surrendering by threatening to kill or torture them. The crew of the targeted ship would hinder the officers from defending the ship, so afraid were they of reprisals. One failed torture session led to one of Low's crew members accidentally cutting him in the mouth. Botched surgery left Low scarred.

A snow called the Unity was added to the fleet, and used as a tender, but was abandoned during an encounter with a man of war named the Mermaid. As Low's success increased in the Caribbean, so did his notoriety. Eventually, a bounty was placed on his head, and Low set out for the Azores, again teaming up with Charles Harris. As they terrorised the Azores, the pressure increased from the authorities, who by then had taken special notice of Low, despite the hordes of pirates in operation at the time.

A defeat

Low, Harris, and their ships left the Azores for the Carolinas. Greyhound had been dispatched under the command of Peter Solgard to hunt down Low and his fleet. Low fled in the Fancy with a skeleton crew and £150,000 in gold on board and headed back to the Azores, leaving Harris and the Ranger behind.

Twenty-five of the crew of the Ranger, including the ship's doctor, were tried between 10 July and 12 July, with Solgard giving evidence and recounting the battle. The men were hanged for felony, piracy, and robbery near Newport, Rhode Island, on 19 July 1723. Harris was sent back to England and hanged at Execution Dock in Wapping. When Solgard returned to New York, he was presented with the freedom of the city and a gold snuffbox for his part in bringing some of Low's crew to justice.

End of Low's career
Low, still captaining the Fancy, sailed north. He captured a whaling vessel 80 miles (130 km) out at sea, and in a foul mood following the encounter with the Greyhound and the loss of Harris, tortured the captain before shooting him through the head. He set the whaler's crew adrift with no provisions intending them to starve to death. They were lucky and reached Nantucket, Massachusetts, after a difficult journey. Remaining off the coast of North America, Low's crew took a fishing boat near Block Island. Low decapitated the ship's master, and sent the crew ashore. When he captured two more fishing boats near Rhode Island, his actions became so savage his crew refused to carry out his orders to torture the fishermen.

Heading south again, Low captured a 22-gun French ship and a large Virginian merchant vessel, the Merry Christmas, in late June 1723. Following the defeat by the Greyhound, Low became "peculiarly cruel" to his English victims. His fleet of three ships rejoined forces with George Lowther in July. In late 1723, Low and Lowther's fleet captured the Delight off the coast of Guinea, mounting fourteen guns on her, with command being given to Spriggs. Two days later, Spriggs and Lowther both abandoned Low, leaving him the Merry Christmas, by now mounted with 34 guns, as his sole ship.

Fate 
There are conflicting reports on the circumstances of Low's death. Captain Charles Johnsonconsidered by some to be Daniel Defoe writing under a pseudonym—stated in his A General History of the Pyrates, at odds with other sources, that Low and the Fancy were last sighted near the Canaries and Guinea. However, at the time of his 1724 book, no further reports had surfaced. He noted one rumour that Low was sailing for Brazil and another that Low's ship sank in a storm with the loss of all hands. The National Maritime Museum in London states that he was never caught, ending his days in Brazil.

The Pirates Own Book and Ossian both suggest that Low was set adrift without provisions by the crew of the Merry Christmas, in a mutiny brought about by Low's murdering of a sleeping subordinate following an argument. His crew elected Captain Shipton to command the Merry Christmas; they would go on to sail alongside Spriggs in the Caribbean. Low was subsequently rescued by a French ship; when the French authorities learned of his identity he was brought to trial and was hanged in Martinique in 1724.

Men of HMS Diamond reported encountering a periagua with nine men aboard in March 1726, recognizing one of them as Low. Diamond had lost her canoe and could not give chase, leaving Low to his fate near Roatan where he was supposedly killed by the indigenous Miskito. Still later in late 1739, a man identified as the "famous Ned Low, formerly well known here for his piracies" was spotted escaping a Spanish fort at Porto Bello. He had been among the fort's gun grews when the city was attackd by British forces during the War of Jenkins' Ear.

Flags

Initially, Low used the same flag as his associate Francis Spriggs. Later, he used his own flag, a red skeletal figure on a black background, which became notorious. He first flew his own flag in late July 1723. Low also used a green silk flag with a yellow figure of a man blowing a trumpet; this Green Trumpeter was hoisted on the mizzen peak to call his fleet's captains to meetings aboard the flagship.

Articles
Low had a set of Articles, a code of conduct. The Articles listed below are attributed to Low by The Boston News-Letter. The first eight of these articles are essentially identical to those attributed to Lowther by Charles Johnson.

It is likely that both reports are correct and that Low and Lowther shared the same articles, with Low's two extra articles being an ordonnance, or amendment, adopted after the two crews separated.

Legacy

Edward Low's acts, along with those of other pirates of the period such as Edward "Blackbeard" Teach, Bartholomew "Black Bart" Roberts, and William Fly, led to a great increase in the military presence to protect shipping lanes, resulting in the effective end of the Golden Age of Piracy.

By 1700, the European states had enough troops and ships at their disposal, following the end of a number of wars, to begin better protecting their important colonies in the West Indies and in the Americas, without relying on the aid of privateers. Pirates based in the Caribbean were chased from the seas by a new British squadron based at Port Royal, Jamaica, and a smaller group of Spanish privateers, sailing from the Spanish Main, known as the Guarda de Costa, or simply the Guarda.

Less is recorded of Low than of other equally prolific pirates such as Teach and Stede Bonnet. Howard Pyle, in an 1880 children's book on pirates, said: "No one stood higher in the trade than [Low], and no one mounted to more lofty altitudes of bloodthirsty and unscrupulous wickedness. 'Tis strange that so little has been written and sung of this man of might, for he was as worthy of story and of song as was Blackbeard." Sir Arthur Conan Doyle, in his work The Green Flag, described Low as "savage and desperate", and a man of "amazing and grotesque brutality". The New York Times said "Low and his crew became the terror of the Atlantic, and his depredations were committed on every part of the ocean, from the coast of Brazil to the Grand Banks of Newfoundland".

Low has featured on stamps and commemorative currency around the Caribbean. A postage stamp featuring Low was commissioned by the Cayman Islands in 1975, and in 1994 the government of Antigua and Barbuda featured Low and his brigantine, Rebecca, on a legal tender one hundred-dollar bill made of gold leaf.

"Ned Low" is one of the pirates featured on the Pirates of the Caribbean ride at the Disneyland theme park in California. A duplicate of Low's flag was used for the flag of the fictional pirate Sao Feng in Disney's Pirates of the Caribbean films. Ned Low was played by Tadhg Murphy in the Starz TV series Black Sails.

Some of Low's haunts, such as the waters around the Isles of Shoals off New Hampshire and Isle Haute in Nova Scotia, attract treasure hunters who seek artifacts in the ships he sank.

See also
List of pirates
Piracy in the Caribbean
Privateer

References

Further reading
Flemming, Gregory. At the Point of a Cutlass: The Pirate Capture, Bold Escape, and Lonely Exile of Philip Ashton. (http://gregflemming.com), ForeEdge (2014) 
Cordingly, David. Under the Black Flag: The Romance and the Reality of Life Among the Pirates. Harvest Books (1997) 
Seitz, Don Carlos; Gospel, Howard F; Wood, Stephen. Under the Black Flag: Exploits of the Most Notorious Pirates. Dover Publications (2002) 
Roberts, Nancy. Blackbeard and Other Pirates of the Atlantic Coast. John F. Blair (1993) 
Crooker, William S; Roberts, Bartholomew; Kidd, William; Easton, Peter. Pirates of the North Atlantic. Nimbus Publishing, Halifax (2004) 
Scoggins, Rebekah. Methods of Torture among the Caribbean Pirates. Agnes Scott College (2005)
Rediker, Marcus. Villains of all Nations: Atlantic Pirates in the Golden Age. Beacon Publishing (2004) 
Whedbee, Charles Harry. Pirates, Ghosts, and Coastal Lore: the Best of Judge Whedbee. John F. Blair (2004)

External links

World History Encyclopedia - Edward Low
"America's Worst Pirates" from gregflemming.com
Guide to Edward Low

1690 births
17th-century English people
18th-century English people
18th-century American people
18th-century pirates
British pirates
People from colonial Boston
People from Westminster
American pirates
British emigrants to the Thirteen Colonies